The Central Department of Public Administration (CDPA) (जन प्रशासन केन्द्रिय विभाग) is the central department for public administration studies in Nepal. It is run under the Faculty of Management (FoM), Tribhuvan University (TU). It is currently located at Jamal. It offers subjects aligned with the civil service system of Nepal.

History
 Initially, public administration education was started with one-year diploma in public administration together with imparting in-service training for HMG Second Class Gazetted Officers under Center for Economic Development and Administration (CEDA) of the Tribhuvan University. Later in 1976, Public Administration Campus (PAC) - a full-fledged constituent campus of the Tribhuvan University was established. PAC was assumed the sole responsibility for education for public administration and undertook "Diploma in Public Administration" (DPA Program until 1979). The mission quickly evolved to include offering Master degree in Public Administration in 1979. To upgrade and get more independent status, the Tribhuvan University has created Central Department of Public Administration (CDPA) in 1986. Since then PAC/CDPA has been imparting education, training and conducting research in the area of public affairs management.

Academics 
Altogether 16 faculty members together with other visiting faculties work as teaching staffs. Around two dozen administrative staffs are also recruited for facilitating the day-to-day administration. The deputy campus chief and the program coordinator are other key personnel for facilitating the program.

The Central Department of Public Administration (CDPA) has close ties with government and incorporates curricular changes and new programs necessary to respond to their needs. Prof. Fred Rigs of the University of Hawaii, Prof. Dr. P.S Bhattanakar of the Rajasthan University of Jaipur, Prof. Avubewa of the University of Philippines were some of the notable distinguished personalities who have also been contributed in the MPA program.

Degrees offered 
The Central Department of Public Administration (CDPA) offers following degrees:
 Bachelor in Public Administration (BPA)
 Master in Public Administration (MPA)
 MPhil in Public Administration (MPhil)
 PhD in Public Administration (PhD)\

Publications 
The Central Department of Public Administration publishes a biannual journal on Public Policy and Governance, Nepalese Journal of Public Policy and Governance. Its students publish the annual journal Administrative Souvenir.
 Nepalese Journal of Public Policy and Governance
 Administrative Souvenir

Affiliated institutions 
Following institutions are affiliated under Central Department of Public Administration (CDPA)
 Public Administration Campus (PAC), Jamal, Kathmandu
 Mahendra Morang Campus (MMC), Biratnagar, Morang

Projects 
The Central Department of Public Administration has been running several projects for developing faculties and quality of education, offered by the department. Some of them are
 Governance Matters: Assessing, Diagnosing, and Addressing Challenges of Governance in Nepal
 Policy and Governance Studies (PGS) in South Asia: Regional Master and Ph.D. Programs\
These Projects have been run with the collaboration with following programs
 NUFU
 NOMA
 NAPSIPAG

References

Tribhuvan University
Central Department